"Around Thirty" is a song written and composed by Seung-Won Kang, and popularly sung by Kim Kwang-Seok. It is one of the songs from Kim's fourth album, and is in the folk music genre.

Many Korean singers have "remade" the song; there are 24 songs with the same name. Tiger JK announced in the Kim Kwang-Suk 12th Memorial Concert that his song "Thumb" was inspired by "Around Thirty".

In 2007, the song was hailed by music critics as having the best lyrics.

See also 
 "The Private's Letter"

References 

1994 songs
South Korean songs
Korean-language songs